Leon County Schools (LCS) is a school district headquartered in the LCS Admin Complex in Tallahassee, Florida, United States.

It is the sole school district of Leon County.

History
Prior to November 2004 the school district allowed parents to have their children moved to schools in proximity to where their parents worked.

Public schools

Elementary schools
Apalachee Elementary School (Est. 1969)
Astoria Park Elementary School (Est. 1969)
Bond Elementary School (Est. 1935, Current Structure Est. 2006)
Buck Lake Elementary School (Est. 1989) 
Canopy Oaks Elementary School (Est. 1998)
Chaires Elementary School (Est. 1929, Current structure Est. 1987)
J. Michael Conley Elementary School (Est. 2008)
DeSoto Trail Elementary School (Est. 1989)
Fort Braden K-8 School (Est. 1847, Current Structure Est. 1994)
Gilchrist Elementary School (Est. 1966)
Hartsfield Elementary School (Est. 1954)
Hawks Rise Elementary School (Est. 1995)
Kate Sullivan Elementary School (Est. 1948)
Killearn Lakes Elementary School (Est. 1985)
Oak Ridge Elementary School (Est. 1969)
Pineview Elementary School, Est. 1956
Riley Elementary School (Est. 1951)
Roberts Elementary School (Est. 2001)
Ruediger Elementary School (Est. 1955)
Sabal Palm Elementary School (Est. 1962)  
Sealey Elementary School (Est. 1930, Current Structure Est. 1969)
Springwood Elementary School (Est. 1987)
W T Moore Elementary School (Est. 1968)
Woodville K-8 School (Est. 1856, Current Structure Est. 1981)

Middle schools
Elizabeth Cobb Middle School, Est. 1954
Deerlake Middle School, Est. 1990
Fairview Middle School, Est. 1970
Griffin Middle School, Est. 1920, Current Structure Est. 1955
William J. Montford Middle School, Est. 2008
R. Frank Nims Middle School, Est. 1958
Augusta Raa Middle School, Est. 1959
Swift Creek Middle School, Est. 1995

High schools

Lawton Chiles (Mascot: Timberwolf), Est. 1999
Godby (Cougar), Est. 1966
Leon (Lion)
Lincoln (Trojan), Est. 1975
Rickards (Raider)
SAIL (Pirate)

Special and alternative schools
Adult Education, Leon
Everhart
Leon Regional Detention Center
Lively Technical Center
Heritage Trails Community School (Jaguars)
Second Chance

Former LCS public schools
 Belle Vue Middle School, 1969-2009
 Caroline Brevard Elementary School, 1925-2007
 Leonard Wesson Elementary School, 1947-2007

Segregated schools
All of the following "colored" schools closed no later than the desegregation of Leon County schools in the late 1960s.
 Old Lincoln High School
 Station One School
 Concord School (Miccosukee)
 St. Peters School
 Lake McBride School
 Macon Community School
 Bell School
 Raney School
 Barrow Hill School
 Lucy Moten School
 Bellaire School
 Rural "negro" schoolhouse near Miller's Pond
 Rural "negro" schoolhouse in Saint Paul

National Blue Ribbon Schools 
The National Blue Ribbon Schools Program recognizes public and private elementary, middle, and high schools based on their overall academic excellence or their progress in closing achievement gaps among student subgroups. Only a few hundred are selected each year from across the nation. The following Leon County Schools have received this prestigious honor.

Kate Sullivan Elementary School- 1985 & 2000
Sealey Elementary School- 1989 
Hawks Rise Elementary School- 2000 & 2015
Killearn Lakes Elementary School- 2004 & 2012
Deerlake Middle School- 2005 
DeSoto Trail Elementary School- 2005
Gilchrist Elementary School- 2008

Superintendents
 Rocky Hanna, 2016–Present 
Hanna took over the reins as superintendent after years of serving as a high school principal. Hanna is the only superintendent to not oversee the opening of any new schools. However, his leadership did oversee the middle school addition to Woodville School. Under Hanna's leadership the district has continued to score a B letter grade from the FL Dept. of Education. Since Hanna took office the districts graduation rate has also improved significantly, now ranking LCS in the top 5 of all Florida school districts with a 94% graduation rate. In 2019, Hanna was named Florida Music Educators Association's Superintendent of the Year for his contributions as superintendent to arts education. Hanna's leadership was also tested with navigating through the coronavirus pandemic. This required Hanna to switch the district to a one to one technology learning platform, a platform several Florida school districts had been on for years prior. Hanna won reelection in 2020, 60-40 over his opponent. Hanna is currently in his second term until 2024.

 Jackie Pons, 2006-2016
Pons took over the district with the hope to continue the continuous success that Montford had built. Pons oversaw the opening of two new schools and the closure of Belle Vue Middle School in the late 2000's. While school grades and scores did not stay as high as they previously were, the FL Dept. of Education began issuing overall school district grades in 2010. Under Pons' leadership the district received three A's, three B's and one C. During Pons' time, three schools were honored by being named a National Blue Ribbon School. Pons also oversaw several construction projects to update school sites as many in the district were dated back to the 60's and 80's. In 2014 an investigation was opened by the Florida Department of Law Enforcement into Pons' handling of several construction contracts. This investigation carried on into the 2016 election where Pons became the third LCS Superintendent to be unseated from office, but the first to be unseated after more than one term. Pons lost to former LCS Principal Rocky Hanna, 54-36. The investigation into Pons was then closed in 2018 with all charges dropped. Post superintendency, Pons went on to be a resource for several educational resources in the community. In 2021, Pons was announced as principal in neighboring Jefferson County.

 William "Bill" J. Montford, 1996-2006
Longtime high school principal Bill Montford won the 1996 election to serve as superintendent. Montford was elected as a new fresh start and as the viewpoint from someone who had recent experience in a school setting. During Montford's leadership he oversaw the opening of three new school sites, the consolidation of Bond and Wesson Elementary Schools, along with the closure of Brevard Elementary. All in efforts relieve overcrowding. 
Superintendent Montford guided the district through the new era of standardized testing with the roll out of FCAT testing, along with the roll out of school accountability and 
school grades. The district made great academic strides under Montford. In the summer of 2001, 72% of schools were graded an A or a B by the FL Dept. of Education meaning only 9 
schools had scored the letter grade of a C. In the summer of 2003, 90% of schools received an A or a B with only 4 schools being graded a C. Montford is also credited for expanding Pre-Kindergarten classes throughout the county. Five schools were also given the distinct recognition of being named a National Blue Ribbon School during Montford's time. Montford also continued to increase salaries for all district employees during his tenure, making LCS one of the highest paying in the region. Montford went on to serve as Florida Senator from 2010-2020 after decades of service to Leon County Schools. William J. Montford Middle School was opened in 2008, in his honor.

Richard Merrick, 1992-1996
Long time school board member Richard Merrick was elected superintendent in 1992. Merrick had also ran for the job in 1988, but was unsuccessful. Mr. Merrick was hopeful to bring consistency back to the school district. Mr. Merrick continued with Mr. Woolley's plans to open three new school. A new K-8 school opened in 1994 and an elementary and middle school followed in 1995. However the changes in leadership resulted in construction whoas. Both 1995 schools were forced to open before they were completed. The middle school opened simply with classrooms only, no front office, no cafeteria, no gym. These school openings did not reflect well on Merrick as it was the middle of his term. Merrick also oversaw several zoning changes in the district as several schools were becoming extremely overcrowded, Merrick also had to "cap" a few schools which required students to be bussed elsewhere. As some schools were being opened unfinished while others down the street had no room for anymore students, Merrick lost his 1996 reelection campaign and became the second superintendent to be unseated and only serve one term.

 William "Bill" Woolley, 1988-1992
Mr. Woolley took over the superintendent reigns following a long history of successful predecessors. Woolley intended to make changes to the district, changes he felt Couch would not make. Immediately after Woolley took over, he announced several leadership changes in the district which resulted in the transfers of almost every principal to a new school. These transfers were met with large backlash from school communities. The same year of Woolleys transfers, he oversaw the opening of two new elementary schools that were planned by previous superintendent Couch. The following year he also oversaw a new middle school opening. Woolley continued to make several administrative changes at schools into the early 90's, some schools found themselves with a new administrator year after year. Woolley began the process to open a new elementary, middle and K-8 school in the district, however all three opened after he left office. Woolley was the first superintendent in LCS history to only serve one term and to be unseated during an election.

 Charles Couch, 1981-1988
Mr. Couch took on the role as superintendent during a period when Leon County as a whole was expanding beyond the city limits. This required Couch to oversee the opening of four new elementary schools. He had also began plans to open a 5th elementary and 2nd middle school, however both schools opened once he had left office. Mr. Couch was known as a hands off superintendent, as not many drastic changes were made under his leadership.

 Dr. Edward Fenn, 1977-1981
 Ned Lovell, 1973-1977
 Freeman Ashmore, 1965-1973
Mr. Ashmore was elected superintendent of Leon County Schools after several years of serving as an area principal of various schools. Mr. Ashmore would guide the district through the desegregation era. This time period was met by many challenges to Mr. Ashmore as it did to many throughout the country. As schools became integrated several black only schools closed for the students to integrate to the previous white only schools. With both demographics coming together to one school, there was instantly a need for more schools throughout the district to accommodate the integration. Mr. Ashmore oversaw the opening of eleven school sites between 1966 and 1970, the most sites to be built in the smallest period of time in LCS history. Mr. Ashmore also began plans to open a new high school, the second high school under his leadership, however it opened once he left office. Mr. Ashmore retired in 1972 after 40+ years of education service.

 Amos P. Godby, 1945-1965
Mr. Godby became Superintendent of Leon County Schools on January 5, 1945. Highlights of his lengthy tenure of leadership include a $5 million bond issue; the raising of Leon County taxpayers' house assessments to appropriate more money for schools; the accreditation of all Leon County public schools; the construction of several of the oldest schools in Leon County to date; and the transition from the one-room schoolhouse into a consolidated school system with more qualified personnel. Two years after Godby left office, the district decided to honor him by naming the newest high school after him and his service. Godby went on to serve as an advocate and pillar in education for students all across Florida. He traveled to all parts of the state, working with school personnel and citizens in an effort to improve education. Through his efforts many new ideas and programs were developed: e.g., driver's education classes, summer school programs, the use of educational television.

References

External links

Leon County Schools homepage

Leon County Schools history

Education in Leon County, Florida
School districts in Florida
Education in Tallahassee, Florida
Schools in Leon County, Florida
Schools in Tallahassee, Florida